The  (Sega Sound Team) was Sega's official in-house band from 1988 to 1993, specializing in rock versions of Sega arcade game themes for Japan-only compilation albums and festival appearances. Consisting of six musicians who worked in Sega's sound department at the time, the band included keyboardists Hiroshi Kawaguchi, Katsuhiro Hayashi, and Kimitaka Matsumae; guitarists Koichi Namiki and Jouji Iijima; bassists Sachio Ogawa and Shingo Komori; and drummer Takehiko Tanabe. Kawaguchi and Komori left the band in 1990 and were replaced by Takenobu Mitsuyoshi on keyboards and Masato Saito on bass, respectively.

Usually, some of these albums that were released would consists of two especially recorded versions of the game soundtrack and the rest would consist of the game's original soundtrack. After the group split, the members resumed work on Sega projects. Mitsuyoshi composed the soundtrack to Virtua Fighter, Daytona USA and the two installments of Shenmue, while Matsumae would be involved in Sega Rally and Virtua Fighter 3.

Although the original group disbanded in 1993, in 2011, former members of the band reunited under the name "Blind Spot", still regularly releasing albums and performing concerts as of 2021.

Discography
All titles are released through Pony Canyon unless stated.

Studio albums

Compilations

Standalone game soundtracks (GSM 1500 series)

Live album

Videography

Band lineups

References

External links
S.S.T.BAND BACK-UP TEAM (Fansite)
Band lineup
1989 concert footage

Japanese instrumental musical groups
Japanese rock music groups
Sega
Video game music cover bands
Video game musicians